The Portuguese Albums Chart ranks the best-performing albums in Portugal, as compiled by the Associação Fonográfica Portuguesa.

References

Portugal Albums
Number-one albums
Albums 2011